New Jersey elected its members November 4, 1828.

See also 
 1828 New Jersey's at-large congressional district special election
 1828 and 1829 United States House of Representatives elections
 List of United States representatives from New Jersey

Bibliography
 
 
 
 
 
 

1828
New Jersey
United States House of Representatives